Christopher Marquis is the Sinyi Professor of Chinese Management at the Judge Business School, University of Cambridge, England, and a Fellow at Jesus College, Cambridge. 

Marquis's research takes a sociological perspective and focuses on corporate strategies, entrepreneurship and social innovation, building sustainable businesses, and doing business in China. He is the author of the award-winning Better Business: How the B Corp Movement is Remaking Capitalism, and Mao and Markets: The Communist Roots of Chinese Enterprise.

Career 
Marquis received his Ph.D. in sociology and business administration from the University of Michigan in 2005. He has a B.A in history from Notre Dame and M.A. in history and M.B.A. with a concentration in finance from the University of Pittsburgh. Prior to his career in academia, Marquis was a Vice President at J.P. Morgan Chase.

From 2005 to 2015, Marquis taught at Harvard Business School, and from 2017 to 2018, he was a Visiting Professor of Social Innovation and Public Policy at Harvard Kennedy School. He has also held visiting professorships at a number of leading Chinese universities. From 2015 to 2022, he was the Samuel C. Johnson Professor in Sustainable Global Enterprise at the Samuel Curtis Johnson Graduate School of Management at Cornell University. He was an associate editor of Administrative Science Quarterly from 2014-2020.

Books 
Marquis’s first book Better Business: How the B Corp Movement is Remaking Capitalism, was published in 2020 by Yale University Press. The book focuses on the ways in which entrepreneurs and companies can effectively shift from a shareholder- to stakeholder- orientation by reforming their governance and accountability systems. 

Better Business has won many awards and recognitions including runner-up in the Financial Times Responsible Business Education Awards and the Axiom Business Book Awards Gold Medal in Business Ethics. It was also a finalist for Porchlight Books Business Book of the Year] and a winner of the Responsible Research in Management Award. The book was listed on the Financial Times Top Business Books in October and, following publication in the UK, the Spears magazine list of four best reads out in January, which called it a “prescient book when capitalism in its current form is coming under question.”

Mao and Markets, published in 2022 by Yale University Press, focuses on how China’s growth over the past four decades has positioned state capitalism as a durable foil to the orthodoxy of free markets. It shows that not only is the widely held assumption that embrace of open markets and private enterprise would inevitably lead to a more liberal society wrong, but also provides an important perspective on how China will be governed in the future.

Academic Research 
Marquis's research in academic journals examines the interactions between corporations, government bodies, and society, and how these interactions can lead to socially and environmentally beneficial outcomes. In recent years, he has especially focused on how these processes unfold in China. His earliest research developed the idea of how organizations and institutions can be imprinted by their initial context.

His work has been published in leading management and sociology journals such as Academy of Management Journal, Academy of Management Review, Administrative Science Quarterly, American Sociological Review, Harvard Business Review, Organization Science, and Strategic Management Journal. This research has been cited well over 10,000 times according to Google Scholar.

Honors and awards 
Marquis has received several honors and awards for his research and teaching:
 Financial Times Responsible Business Education Awards Runner-Up, 2022 (for Better Business)
 Responsible Research in Management Award, Community for Responsible Research in Business and Management (RRBM), 2021 (for Better Business)
 Axiom Business Book Awards 2021 Gold Medal, Business Ethics Category (for Better Business)
 Best Business Book of 2020 Finalist, Porchlight Books (for Better Business), Runner-up in Management & Workplace Culture category
 2020 Responsible Research in Management Award Finalist, Community for Responsible Research in Business and Management (RRBM)
 International Educator Award, from China’s State Administration of Foreign Expert Affairs, 2018
 Aspen Institute Faculty Pioneer Award Finalist for his course on social entrepreneurship, 2013
 Academy of Management, William H. Newman Award for the best paper based on a dissertation, 2006
 American Sociological Association, James D. Thompson Award for best graduate student paper, 2003

Teaching 
Marquis's teaching is in the areas of strategic management and leadership, and includes topics such as social entrepreneurship and innovation, sustainability, digital transformation, and doing business in China. He has also published over 50 Harvard case studies on these topics For PhD’s he regularly offers a course in strategic processes and organization theory.

References

External links 
 Personal website

Living people
Academics of the University of Cambridge
Management scientists
University of Michigan alumni
University of Notre Dame alumni
Year of birth missing (living people)